20 Centimeters is a 2005 Spanish-French film about a narcoleptic transgender woman's life as she works to get the surgery to fix her "20 centímetros" problem. The film was written and directed by Ramón Salazar, and stars Mónica Cervera as Marieta and Pablo Puyol as Raúl, the man who loves "all" of Marieta. The film premiered at the 2005 Málaga Film Festival.

Plot
Marieta (Mónica Cervera), a transgender woman, works as a prostitute in the city of Madrid to save money for a sex change operation. Her narcoleptic spells cause her to fall asleep at any sudden moment, and each time she dreams she is the star of musical numbers where she is free to sing and dance as her true self. Marieta meets a man who works at the market, Raúl (Pablo Puyol), and he loves her with her appendage.  This creates a conflict for Marieta, who is happy about her new found love, yet so desperately wants her operation to feel like her whole true self.

Cast

Reception
On Rotten Tomatoes the film has an approval rating of 44% based on reviews from 16 critics.

Awards 
 Locarno International Film Festival (2005)
 Nominee (Golden Leopard ): Ramón Salazar
 Nominee (Youth Jury Award): Ramón Salazar
 Miami Gay and Lesbian Film Festival (2006)
 Winner (Special Jury Award): Ramón Salazar
 Málaga Spanish Film Festival (2006)
 Winner (Best Make-up): Ana Lozano
 Winner (Critics Award): Ramón Salazar
 Winner (Silver Biznaga/ Best Music): Najwa Nimri, Pascal Gaigne
 Nominee (Golden Biznaga): Ramón Salazar
 Verzaubert - International Gay & Lesbian Film Festival (2006)
 Winner(Rosebud/ Best Film): Ramón Salazar

See also 
 List of Spanish films of 2005
 List of French films of 2005

References

External links
 

Spanish LGBT-related films
2005 films
2005 LGBT-related films
Jukebox musical films
2000s musical films
LGBT-related musical films
Films about trans women
English-language French films
English-language Spanish films
2000s Spanish films
2000s French films
Films set in Madrid
2000s Spanish-language films